Angry Birds Trilogy is a video game co-developed by Rovio Entertainment, Exient Entertainment, Housemarque, and Fun Labs and published by Activision.

The game contains the first three games of the popular mobile game series (Angry Birds, Angry Birds Seasons and Angry Birds Rio) and was released for Xbox 360, PlayStation 3 and on Nintendo 3DS on September 25, 2012 in North America and September 28 in Europe. Both the PlayStation 3 and Xbox 360 versions of the game are able to be played with motion controls along with the traditional controllers. The game was released on Wii and Wii U consoles on August 13, 2013 in North America and on August 16 in Europe. The game was released for the PlayStation Vita in October 2013.

This compilation includes exclusive levels that cannot be found on the original games. The game also contains biographies of each bird, except for Hal (green bird), Bubbles (orange bird), and Stella (pink bird).  To ensure that the compilation is considerably up to date with more recent versions of the originally released games, Rovio released downloadable content packs, such as the Anger Management Pack and the Fowl Temper Pack, on select platforms. The Anger Management Pack was made available on December 18, 2012, and the Fowl Tempered Pack was made available on March 8, 2013.

Gameplay 
In Angry Birds Trilogy, the player controls a flock of multi-colored birds that are attempting to retrieve their eggs, which have been stolen by a group of hungry green pigs (on the Angry Birds Rio levels, the birds are trying to get back to their eggs). On each level, the pigs (in Rio, caged birds or marmosets) are sheltered by structures made of various materials such as wood, glass, and stone, and the objective of the game is to eliminate them on the level. Using a slingshot, players launch the birds with the intent of either hitting the pigs directly or damaging the structures, causing them to collapse and pop the pigs. In various stages of the game, additional objects such as explosive crates and rocks are found in the structures and may be used in conjunction with the birds to pop hard-to-reach pigs.

Controls 
Most versions of Trilogy support motion controls (or require them, as in the Wii version), where players can use a pointer-based motion control system (such as the Move's Orb or the Kinect sensor's hand tracker) or a touch screen to operate and aim the slingshot.  If motion controls are not preferred, the slingshot is instead controlled with an analog stick.

In all versions, except the Wii and Nintendo 3DS versions, it is possible to quickly reset a level by holding down a certain controller button for two seconds.

Reception 
IGN's Lucas M. Thomas noted the enhanced visuals and its extras, but was unfavorable on the motion controls, as opposed to the standard controls, and the price tag. "If you've already spent your $2.97 before [...] just go back to your iPhone. If unhealthily addicted to all things Angry Birds though, feel free to pick up this package.". The latter remark was also made by Ron DelVillano of Nintendo Life. Robert Workman of GameZone panned the 3DS version, comparably to the home console versions and the original mobile one, regarding the design as underwhelming and effects as "minimal". Dan Whitehead of Eurogamer decried the Kinect feature on the Xbox 360 version, calling it worse than the gameplay on the mobile versions, and slightly worse than the PlayStation Move.

References

External links 

 

2012 video games
Activision games
Kinect games
Nintendo 3DS games
Nintendo 3DS eShop games
Nintendo Network games
PlayStation 3 games
PlayStation Move-compatible games
PlayStation Vita games
Trilogies
Video game compilations
Video games developed in Finland
Xbox 360 games
Wii games
Wii U games
Wii U eShop games
Puzzle video games
Trilogy
Rovio Entertainment games
Housemarque games
Exient Entertainment games
Single-player video games
Fun Labs games